"What's Going On in Your World" the title of a song written by David Chamberlain, Royce Porter and Red Steagall, and recorded by American country music artist George Strait.  It was released in April 1989 as the second single from his album, Beyond the Blue Neon.  The song was his 17th number-one single as well as his eleventh consecutive number one.

Content
The narrator contacts his former lover to inquire of her welfare in the time since the dissolution of their relationship.

Critical reception
Kevin John Coyne of Country Universe gave the song an A grade, calling the song "a testament to the ability of a compelling melody, and a simple no-frills country production to connect with deep-seated emotions, even without a word being sung." He goes on to say that "even if the lyrics had not been so potent, “What’s Going On In Your World” would still have legs to stand as an instrumental showcase, thanks in large part to the mourful, crying fiddle that winds through the song."

Chart performance
"What's Going On in Your World" reached number 1 on the Billboard Hot Country Songs chart and number 2 on the Canadian RPM Country Tracks chart.

Year-end charts

References

1989 singles
George Strait songs
Songs written by Royce Porter
Songs written by Red Steagall
Song recordings produced by Jimmy Bowen
MCA Records singles
1989 songs
Songs written by David Chamberlain (songwriter)